The Woman from Tangier is a 1948 American crime film directed by Harold Daniels and starring Adele Jergens, Stephen Dunne and Ian MacDonald. It was one of a number of Hollywood films set in Tangier during the International Zone era. The film's art direction was by Walter Holscher.

Plot
A dancer known to everyone by the name Nylon has been working in Morocco at a somewhat disreputable nightclub owned by Paul Morales, who gets into some trouble with police. Nylon decides to set sail for Gibraltar on the North Empress, which docks along the way in Tangier.

Tens of thousands of dollars are reported missing from the ship's safe. Capt. Sam Graves also is notified that the ship's purser has been found murdered. Insurance investigator Ray Shapley tries to piece together what happened, and after he questions Nylon, a romantic attraction between them develops.

Morales turns up aboard ship. He reveals to Nylon that he was responsible for the theft and murder, along with his accomplice, Graves, the ship's captain. Graves is persuaded that Nylon knows too much and must be done away with, but Shapley rescues her just in time.

Cast
 Adele Jergens as Nylon  
 Stephen Dunne as Ray Shapley  
 Ian MacDonald as Paul Morales  
 Donna Martell as Flo-Flo  
 Denis Green as Capt. Graves  
 Robert Tafur as Prefect of Police  
 Michael Duane as Ned Pankin 
 Curt Bois as Parquit 
 Anton Kosta as LeDeux  
 Ivan Triesault as Rocheau 
 Maurice Marsac as Martine
 Art Dupuis as Gendarme 
 George J. Lewis as Albert Franz - the Pilot

References

Bibliography
 Edwards, Brian T. Morocco Bound: Disorienting America’s Maghreb, from Casablanca to the Marrakech Express. Duke University Press, 7 Oct 2005.

External links

1948 films
American crime films
American black-and-white films
1948 crime films
Films directed by Harold Daniels
Columbia Pictures films
Films set in Tangier
1940s English-language films
1940s American films